Pengkalan Pasir is a small town in Kelantan, Malaysia.

Events
6 December 2005 - Pengkalan Pasir by-elections

References

Towns in Kelantan